Ibrahima Kandia Diallo (15 November 1941 – 10 May 2018) was a Guinean footballer, playing in 56 games and scoring 33 goals. He competed in the men's tournament at the 1968 Summer Olympics.

International goals

Scores and results list Guinea's goal tally first, score column indicates score after each Guinea goal

References

External links
 
 

1941 births
2018 deaths
Guinean footballers
Guinea international footballers
Olympic footballers of Guinea
Footballers at the 1968 Summer Olympics
Sportspeople from Conakry
Association football forwards